Trichodorus  is a genus of terrestrial root feeding (stubby-root) nematodes in the Trichodoridae family (trichorids), being one of five genera. They are economically important plant parasites and virus vectors.

Taxonomy 
As originally described by Cobb in 1913, Trichodorus was the only genus in its family. However, in 1974 the genus was split into two genera in 1974 by Siddiqi, Trichodorus and Paratrichodorus.

The genus, which is the largest in the family consists of 54 species. The females are didelphic (two genital tracts), and are distributed worldwide.

Plant pathology 
Trichorids became of interest in 1951. At that time Trichodorus christie (=Paratrichodorus minor) was recognised as a pest of crops in Florida.

References

Bibliography 

De Ley, P & Blaxter, M 2004, 'A new system for Nematoda: combining morphological characters with molecular trees, and translating clades into ranks and taxa'. in R Cook & DJ Hunt (eds), Nematology Monographs and Perspectives. vol. 2, E.J. Brill, Leiden, pp. 633–653.
Decraemer, W. 1980. Systematics of the Trichodoridae (Nematoda) with keys to their species. Revue. Nematol. 3(1): 81-99.

DECRAEMER, W. & BAUJARD, P., 1998. Additions and corrections to: Decraemer: The Family Trichodoridae.  Fundamental and Applied Nematology 21 (2): 207-212.

Enoplea genera